The Embassy of Syria in Washington, D.C. is the suspended diplomatic mission of the Syrian Arab Republic to the United States. The final ambassador of the Syrian Arab Republic was Imad Moustapha. A Charge D'Affaires has not been named.

The embassy along with two honorary consulates were ordered to suspend operations on March 18, 2014 by U.S. special envoy for Syria Daniel Rubinstein, who stated that "We have determined it is unacceptable for individuals appointed by that regime to conduct diplomatic or consular operations in the United States".

The United States subsequently recognized the diplomatic mission of the National Coalition for Syrian Revolutionary and Opposition Forces on 5 May 2014.

History of building

The building is notable for being the home of former US President William Howard Taft, who died in the building on March 8, 1930.  He had lived in this house for 9 years. The building, constructed in 1908 and designed by noted architect Appleton P. Clark, Jr., is located at 2215 Wyoming Avenue in the Kalorama neighborhood of Washington, D.C.

Syrian Civil War
During February 2012, large scale protests were held at the embassy, condemning the alleged "violent government crackdown" against the popular uprising taking place in Syria, which would become the beginning of the Syrian Civil War. These protests were caused partially by the rejection of China and Russia of a proposed resolution, during a UNSC emergency session. Such protests occurred in other Syrian embassies worldwide, such as London and Istanbul.

While the Syrian embassy remained open after the Assad government's crackdown upon Arab Spring protestors, Syrian diplomat Bassam Barabandi was actively working with the Syrian Opposition and United States government to aid opposition figures with passports and provide information regarding the government.

See also 
 Syria-United States relations
 List of diplomatic missions in Washington, D.C.
 Ambassador of Syria to the United States

References

External links
 

Syria
Washington, D.C.
Defunct diplomatic missions in the United States
Syria–United States relations